"Se Vende" is a song recorded by the Spanish singer-songwriter Alejandro Sanz. The song serves as second single for Sanz's ninth studio album La Música No Se Toca (2012). It was released for digital download on 17 September 2012. Five days before the date of release, he released a teaser of the music video, showing only 57 seconds of it.

Song information

Se Vende is the second single of Sanz's ninth studio album, La Música No Se Toca . This song is written by Alejandro Sanz himself along with Colombian Grammy award winner Julio Reyes. 
Lyrics of the song shows that how much love and hate are close to each other. In many parts of the song, Alejandro clearly talked about how his love sold her soul.

Music video

The video was filmed in Madrid, Spain under the direction of renowned Spanish director David Alcalde, who has developed an original idea of showing three couples dancing mixed by stories of love and hate. 
Just like the song, Music video released on September 17 at a total length of exact four minutes and is available on iTunes, radio, television and in his official YouTube channel. 
in the video, we saw three couples dancing and Alejandro walking around and singing. while couples are dancing with attitude of showing love and hate at the same time, Sanz keep singing and walking under rain and then snow. 
At the finish, all couples gave each other hugs and Alejandro looked at the light and walked away.

Charts

Weekly charts

Year-end charts

Song Credits
 Producers: Julio Reyes Copello, Alejandro Sanz
 Recording Engineers: Edgar Barrera, Alejandro Sanz, Julio Reyes Copello, Lee Levin
 Mixed by: Sebastian Krys
 Arrangements and Programming: Julio Reyes Copello
 Acoustic Guitar: Andres Castro
 Electric Guitar: Andres Castro, Carlos Rufo
 Bass: Guillermo Vadala
 Drums: Lee Levin
 Back vocals: Robert Elias, Jackie Mendez
 Keyboard: Julio Reyes Copello
 Piano: Julio Reyes Copello

References

External links
"Se Vende" Video teaser

2012 singles
Spanish-language songs
Alejandro Sanz songs
Songs written by Alejandro Sanz
Pop ballads
Universal Music Latino singles
2012 songs
Songs written by Julio Reyes Copello
Song recordings produced by Julio Reyes Copello